Handan University is a university based in Handan, Hebei province, People's Republic of China. It is a comprehensive university which offers courses from the Humanities to Sciences.

History 
Handan University established in December, 1905, has been operating in the higher education for over 60 years. The college has endured several historical periods from the end of Qing Dynasty to the foundation of the People’s Republic of China. Thus, the education policies of each period have imprinted their influences on its development from a primary normal school of Handan County to a junior senior normal school and to a university of Handan City.

Campus
Handan University has developed into a comprehensive university, with a total area of 413,846 square meters, among which the teaching building covers 173,894 square meters, and students’ accommodation of 55,867 square meters.

Library 
The library is equipped with 595,000 books and a digital library and advanced equipment and technology of multi-media and computer network have been used widely in teaching and scientific research. So the campus looks harmonious and elegant, simple and quiet, bathed in a thick cultural and academic atmosphere.

In the last 60 years, 30,000 students have graduated from Handan University. The university has around 10,000 full-time students.

References

External links 
Handan University Official Website

Universities and colleges in Hebei
Educational institutions established in 1905
1905 establishments in China
Handan